Gimme Gimme Gimme is a BBC television sitcom by Tiger Aspect Productions that was first aired in three series from 1999 to 2001. It was written by Jonathan Harvey, who developed the series with Kathy Burke.

The title from the show stems from both the main characters' continual search for a male partner, and the theme music is a cover of ABBA's "Gimme! Gimme! Gimme! (A Man After Midnight)". The first two series were originally shown on BBC Two and were deemed successful enough for the third series to be shown on BBC One.

Burke received two BAFTA nominations for Best Comedy Performance for playing the lead character, Linda La Hughes. The show received a nomination in the Best Scripted Comedy category for its third series.

Premise
Gimme Gimme Gimme centres on loudmouthed Londoner Linda La Hughes (played by comedian and director Kathy Burke) and her gay flatmate, actor Tom Farrell (played by James Dreyfus). A modern twist on the traditional "odd couple" format, much of Gimme Gimme Gimme's humour springs from its lubricious innuendo subplot, which comes from the mouths of both Tom and Linda.

Linda is characterised by her red hair, white glasses and plump, lycra-clad figure. Boorish, unattractive Linda is convinced she is a "stunner"; in series three she is finally diagnosed with reverse body dysmorphic disorder. It is suggested that Linda and Tom first met at a nightclub, bonded instantly (due to both being on ecstasy), and decided to live together. What follows is, as writer Jonathan Harvey describes, "one long comedown". Linda often tells humorous anecdotes about her family and childhood which suggest abuse or neglect (such as how she apparently slept on a doormat as a baby, lived in a kennel as a child, and was left in a car-boot for the two weeks her aunt went on holiday), but she always thinks of these as positive experiences. She also claims that her Daddy now lives in an iron lung, although the only proof she has is a photo of a sideboard. Linda also lived in a convent and was sent to  a borstal as a teenager. She has crushes on Liam Gallagher (in whom she lost interest after series one as she "couldn't bring up another bird's child"), Robbie Williams, and both male members of Hear'Say. She also imagines having sex with Dale Winton in a toilet cubicle.

Tom is melodramatic yet fails in his desire to get acting roles. He believes himself to be truly gifted in the art of acting, and often blames his failures on his agent or society itself. He did appear in one episode of EastEnders and often brags about it, delaying for as long as he can the fact that he was in one scene, had one line, and did nothing but buy a cagoule from Bianca Jackson's market stall. He also appeared in Daylight Robbery as an extra, standing in a queue in the background. He had one line but it was cut due to timekeeping. He insists that the entire series was ruined due to the axing of his line. Tom has an obsession with appearing to be middle-class even though he hails from a working-class background, possibly because he also hates his parents. It is often suggested that Tom has no friends whatsoever (apart from Linda and his housemates) but unlike Linda he usually tries to pretend he is popular. Tom is in love with the actor Simon Shepherd.

Although they appear to loathe each other, Tom and Linda are beholden to each other due to the simple fact that nobody else can tolerate them. They are in many ways alike: selfish, unsuccessful, and physically and personally unattractive - although Tom less so. The hapless duo live in a Kentish Town flat (69 Paradise Passage, Kentish Town) rented from elderly ex-prostitute Beryl Merit (Rosalind Knight). Other regular characters are the middle-class, horny married couple Jez (Brian Bovell) and Suze (Beth Goddard). Many of the storylines revolve around the fact that Tom and Linda find Jez sexually attractive and (particularly Linda) despise the oblivious Suze. Another recurring character is Sugar Walls (Elaine Lordan), Linda's celebrity sister. Many of the other characters can be just as hapless as Tom and Linda; Beryl still engages in sexual activities such as S&M and picking up young and married men, while Jez and Suze generally lack common sense. For example, they once cancelled their holiday to the Algarve and paid £500 to stay in their own back garden after Linda opened it up as a campsite.

On at least one occasion the fourth wall is broken when a previous series was referenced by Linda.

At the end of series three, Tom finally got his big break in TV soap opera Crossroads. The last episode ended with Tom leaving the flat and Linda taking off her hair (revealing it to be a wig) and sitting in the flat alone.

Characters

Regular
Linda La Hughes (Kathy Burke) – Linda is portrayed as an unattractive middle-aged woman who usually wears skin tight, colourful clothing. Linda grabs any opportunity to bluntly flirt with any man she sees. She is delusional about her appearance; in the Series 3 episode "Trauma", she's finally diagnosed with reversed body dysmorphic disorder. Her age is uncertain as she has announced different ages through the three series e.g. 16, 18, 19, 23 and 28. In the Series 2 episode "Dirty Thirty", her birth certificate reveals that she is 39 – but in the Series 3 episode "Secrets and Flies" she is unexpectedly reunited with her 28-year-old son; she says she was 15 when she gave birth to him, meaning she must be 43. Linda, originally from Portsmouth, has a large family consisting of a son named Zippy, two cousins, Simon who has a wonky eye, Velma who works in Soho who has an act called "Snatch and Ladders", two aunties, Nitty and Ivy, an uncle called Tyrone and a sister called Sharon Hughes who changed her name to Sugar Walls. Her Mother, called "Queenie" (and oddly referred to in one episode as "Dolly") died when Linda was a child but there is some uncertainty as to the cause; Linda tells Tom's mum that she collapsed in a paddling pool in Pinner, but her sister Sugar Walls states that she electrocuted herself on her own Slendertone pads. Her Daddy hides from her, although she thinks he's in an iron lung, but he does send her Christmas Presents. When Linda is asked what her father's name is by her son Zippy, she replies "Daddy".

Thomas Thessalonius "Tom" Farrell (James Dreyfus) – Tom is a 30-year-old wannabe (but bad) actor who has only had small roles on TV and on stage. Tom is openly gay and seizes every possible opportunity to get a boyfriend. Throughout Series 1, he often refers to using drugs once at home when he mistook a sleeping tablet for an E, the other when reading what "middle class" people should do "the middle class person will not go to sleazy night club and get off his tits on ecstasy". He also tends to exaggerate a lot. Series 3 concludes with him moving to Nottingham to join the cast of Crossroads.

Beryl Merit (Rosalind Knight) – Beryl is the elderly landlady of 69 Paradise Passage. She is a retired prostitute but stays involved in criminal activities such as shoplifting and bootlegging; in the Series 2 episode "Glad to be Gay?" she's seen to be an escort. Her best friend is Renée, a fellow former prostitute whom she often mentions and is seen chatting to on the phone, but who never appears.

Jez Littlewood (Brian Bovell) – Jez is Tom and Linda's hunky middle-class neighbour. When Tom and Linda first meet Jez, they think one of them has slept with him, but actually he had just slept on the sofa. Both Tom and Linda constantly lust after him; whilst Tom tends to be subtle about his feelings, Linda boorishly propositions Jez at every opportunity – even in Suze's presence. However, Jez is devoted to his wife.

Suze Littlewood (Beth Goddard) – Suze is Jez's ditzy wife. She can sometimes be nice but on other occasions she can be hyperactive and rather irritating, unintentionally coming off as a burden. Tom and Linda loathe Suze for standing in the way of their pursuit of Jez. Linda, especially, showers her with vicious insults, most of which go way over her head. She and Jez have a voracious – often vociferous – sex life. In the Series 3 episode "Secrets and Flies" (featuring Linda's own long-lost son), she gives birth to their baby boy, Lee-on-Solent "Lee" Littlewood. Suze has also stated that she is a "committed vegetarian", with a liking for spinach pie and quorn placenta.

Recurring
Norma (Doña Croll) – Tom's agent who features in every series.

Sharon Hughes/Sugar Walls (Elaine Lordan) is Linda's famous sister. She is a model, but is more famous for her promiscuity than her modelling career. She appears in series 1 and returns in series 2.

Simon Shepherd is Tom's celebrity crush. Simon is famous for starring in Peak Practice. He appears in every series.

Guest appearances

 Michele Austin
 Frances Barber
 Mark Benton
 Adrian Bower
 Moya Brady
 Richard Cant
 Debbie Chazen
 Charlie Condou
 Phil Daniels
 Hazel Douglas
 Mel Giedroyc
 Jonathan Harvey
 William Hope
 Anna Keaveney
 Rose Keegan
 Chris Langham
 Nimmy March
 Geraldine McNulty
 Melinda Messenger
 Ann Mitchell
 Mark Monero
 Patsy Palmer
 Sue Perkins
 Su Pollard. Pollard played a character called Heidi Honeycombe; when she appeared, Linda greeted her with "Heidi! Hi!" (a reference to Hi-de-Hi! in which Pollard starred).
 Rowland Rivron
 Zita Sattar
 David Schneider
 Christopher Simon
 Sophie Stanton
 Ronan Vibert
 Dale Winton
 The Pink Singers

Production
The series was filmed in front of a live studio audience in Studio 2 at The London Studios, South Bank, London.

Writer Jonathan Harvey appeared in three episodes; as a guest at the series 1 wedding, once as make-up artist Louis, and then as a customer in a sofa store.

Episodes

Gimme Gimme Gimme has broadcast three series and 19 episodes in total. The first series premiered on BBC Two on 8 January 1999 and lasted for six episodes, concluding on 12 February 1999. Following this, a Millennium special was screened at the end of the year on 29 December 1999. A second series commenced on 14 January 2000 and finished on 18 February 2000, again including six episodes. A short sketch included as part of Comic Relief was broadcast on 16 March 2001. Due to the high viewing figures and success the show received, it was moved to BBC One for a six-episode third series which was the last. Each episode was written by Jonathan Harvey and directed by Liddy Oldroyd for the first two series and the special; the third series was directed by Tristram Shapeero.

Reception

Ratings

Awards and nominations

Home media

The Complete Collection was re-released again in 2011 in a standard DVD case and the 2006 box set went out of print. The UK DVD releases have both Region 2 and Region 4 encoding on each season and the complete set.

From November 2020, the entire series was made available on BBC iPlayer for one year.

References
Brown, David (2015) The BBC would never make Gimme Gimme Gimme today, says its writer Jonathan Harvey Radio Times
Harvey, Jonathan (2002). Gimme Gimme Gimme: The Book Boxtree. .

Further reading
Padva. Gilad (2005). Desired Bodies and Queer Masculinities in Three Popular TV Sitcoms. In Lorek-Jezinska, Edyta and Wieckowska, Katarzyna (Eds.), Corporeal Inscriptions: Representations of the Body in Cultural and Literary Texts and Practices(pp. 127–138). Torun, Poland: Nicholas Copernicus University Press.

External links

1999 British television series debuts
2001 British television series endings
1990s British LGBT-related television series
1990s British sitcoms
1990s LGBT-related comedy television series
1990s sex comedy television series
2000s British LGBT-related comedy television series
2000s British sex comedy television series
2000s British sitcoms
BBC television sitcoms
British LGBT-related sitcoms
English-language television shows
Gay-related television shows
Television series by Banijay
Television series by Tiger Aspect Productions
Television shows set in London
2000s LGBT-related sitcoms
1990s LGBT-related sitcoms